Manfred Schmorde (born 18 September 1946 in Großsteinberg, Saxony) is a German rower. He competed for the SC Dynamo Berlin / Sportvereinigung (SV) Dynamo and won medals at international rowing competitions.

References

External links
 

1946 births
Living people
East German male rowers
Olympic medalists in rowing
World Rowing Championships medalists for East Germany
Medalists at the 1972 Summer Olympics
Olympic bronze medalists for East Germany
Olympic rowers of East Germany
Rowers at the 1972 Summer Olympics
European Rowing Championships medalists
Sportspeople from Saxony